Marlaine Gordon is a British actress.

Acting career
One of Gordon's first roles was playing Amanda Jackson in Through The Dragon's Eye (1989), an educational children's programme made for BBC Two's Look and Read productions.

One of her most notable television credits was playing Aisha Pinnock in the BBC sitcom Us Girls (1992), but she is most famous for playing the role of Lydia, the bubbly girlfriend of Steve Elliot (Mark Monero), in the popular BBC soap opera EastEnders (1995–1996).

Music career
Marlaine was in a girl band called E'voke.

Personal life
In 2001 Gordon's boyfriend Martin Rimmer, a soldier with the Queen's Guard, died in the corridor of his barracks following a forbidden alcohol binge with his colleagues. The cause of death given was inhalation of vomit in association with acute alcoholic poisoning.

References

External links 

English soap opera actresses
English television actresses
English women singers
Year of birth missing (living people)
Living people